Rabindranath is the fourth album by the Bengali rock band Shironamhin. Laser Vision released the album on 2010 in Bangladesh.

The album's eleven songs are inspired by Rabindranath Tagore, a Bengali polymath who reshaped his region's literature and music.

Background 

Shironamhin Rabindranath is the fourth studio album of the band, featuring rock interpretations of Tagore's songs, known as Rabindra Sangeet. The band held that Rabindranath Tagore important for them culturally, especially as Bengalis. Lead vocalist Tanzir Tuhin studied the songs at Bulbul Lalitakala Academy (BAFA). As band member Zia noted, part of the motivation in making this album was the feeling that many of their fans, particularly adolescents, were unfamiliar with Rabindra Sangeet, and hope that it would revitalise interest in Tagore.

Track listing 

All songs was written by Rabindranath Tagore.

Track listing

Personnel 

 Tanzir Tuhin – vocals
 Ziaur Rahman Zia – bass guitar, khol, mridanga, dholok
 Kazi Ahmad Shafin – drums
 Diat Khan – guitar, banjo
 Razib – keyboard
 Tushar – guitar]]

References 

Shironamhin albums
Laser Vision albums
2010 albums
Bengali music